Nguyễn Tư Nghiêm (1919 – 15 June 2016) was a Vietnamese lacquer painter. He was awarded the Ho Chi Minh Prize for fine art in 1996.

References

1919 births
2016 deaths
People from Nghệ An province
20th-century Vietnamese painters
Lacquerware artists
Ho Chi Minh Prize recipients